The 2007 D.C. United season was the club's 13th year of existence. It was also their 12th consecutive season in Major League Soccer, the top-tier of professional soccer in the United States and Canada.

The season saw the departure of three-year coach, Piotr Nowak, who became an assistant manager to Bob Bradley for the United States national soccer team. It marked the debut of assistant coach Tom Soehn, becoming promoted to Head Coach duties.

2007 was highlighted as the most successful regular season in the United's history, where the club had a 16-7-7 record; a record strong enough to win their fourth MLS Supporters' Shield. The club became the first club in MLS history to win consecutively win the Shield (United won it in 2006, also). In spite of their record-setting fourth Shield, the United would lose to Chicago Fire 3-2 on aggregate in the MLS Cup Playoffs during the quarterfinals.

Outside of MLS, the United had one of the busiest schedules of tournaments in league history, participating in a total of four tournaments; two domestic and two international. Their international tournaments were highlighted a deep campaign in the CONCACAF Champions League, where the Black-and-Red made a semifinal run, before bowing out to eventual runners-up Guadalajara, 3-2 on aggregate. The United also played Guadalajara in late September in the Copa Sudamericana final stages, where they would fall on a 2-1 aggregate score-line. To date, it was the last time an MLS club played in a South American tournament, which they were invited to as third-place finishers in the 2007 CONCACAF Champions Cup.

The United also participated in the inaugural North American SuperLiga, and had a very brief stint in the U.S. Open Cup. In the SuperLiga, the United would make it to the semifinals before losing to cross-nation rivals, L.A. Galaxy on a 2-0 defeat. They would also lose their first third-round proper in the Open Cup 1-0 to Harrisburg City.

Club

2007 roster

Standings

Major League Soccer 

D.C. United's twelfth season in Major League Soccer began on March 27 and ended on October 23, 2007. United finished in first place in both the Eastern Conference and the overall standings, clinching their second-consecutive Supporters' Shield.

Eastern Conference table

Overall table

 - Toronto FC cannot qualify for the CONCACAF Champions League through MLS.  Rather, they can qualify through the Canadian Championship.If they had qualified for the Champions League through MLS, then the highest placed team not already qualified would have qualified.

 - Additional Champions League berths were awarded to the winner (Houston) and runner-up (New England) of MLS Cup 2007.The winner of the 2007 U.S. Open Cup (New England) also qualified.Because New England qualified twice, an additional berth was awarded to the 2007 MLS Supporters' Shield runner-up (Chivas USA).

Results summary

Results by round

North American SuperLiga 

Group B

Match reports

Major League Soccer

MLS Cup Playoffs

Conference semifinals

CONCACAF Champions Cup

Quarterfinals

Semifinals

Copa Sudamericana

First round

North American SuperLiga

Group stage

Quarterfinals

U.S. Open Cup

Kits

Notes 

D.C. United seasons
D.C. United
D.C. United
2007 in sports in Washington, D.C.
2007